Mohammed Abdul Kabir is a senior member of the Taliban leadership and an acting third deputy prime minister, alongside Abdul Ghani Baradar and Abdul Salam Hanafi, of Afghanistan since 4 October 2021. He previously was the acting prime minister of Afghanistan from 16 April 2001 to 13 November 2001.

The United Nations reports that he was Second Deputy of the Taliban's Council of Ministers; Governor of Nangarhar Province; and Head of the Eastern Zone.
The U.N. reports that Kabir was born between 1958 and 1963, in Paktia, Afghanistan, and is from the Zadran tribe.
The U.N. reports that Kabir is active in terrorist operations in Eastern Afghanistan.

Career
In April 2002, Abdul Razzak
told the Associated Press that Kabir was believed to have fled Nangarhar to Paktia, along with Ahmed Khadr

The Chinese News Agency Xinhua reported that Abdul Kabir was captured in Nowshera, Pakistan, on July 16, 2005.
Captured with Abdul Kabir were his brother Abdul Aziz, Mullah Abdul Qadeer, Mullah Abdul Haq, and a fifth unnamed member of the Taliban leadership.

On July 19, 2006, United States Congressman Roscoe G. Bartlett listed Abdul Kabir as a former suspected terrorist who the US government no longer considers a threat.

In spite of these reports, intelligence officials quoted in Asia Times indicated Kabir and other senior Taliban leaders may have been in  North Waziristan, Pakistan, during Ramadan 2007, planning an offensive in southeastern Afghanistan.

Xinhua reported on October 21, 2007, quoting from an account from Daily Afghanistan, that Abdul Kabir had been appointed commander in Nangarhar, Laghman, Kunar and Nooristan provinces.

A report on February 21, 2010, stated that Kabir was captured in Pakistan as a result of intelligence gleaned from Mullah Baradar, himself taken into custody earlier in the month. Kabir was later released.

References

1958 births
Afghan expatriates in Pakistan
Living people
Pashtun people
People from Nangarhar Province
Prime Ministers of Afghanistan
Taliban government ministers of Afghanistan
Taliban governors